Rab11 family-interacting protein 4 is a protein that in humans is encoded by the RAB11FIP4 gene.

Interactions
RAB11FIP4 has been shown to interact with RAB11A.

References

Further reading